The 1997 Trophée Lalique was the fourth event of six in the 1997–98
ISU Champions Series, a senior-level international invitational competition series. It was held at the Palais omnisports de Paris-Bercy in Paris on November 13–16. Medals were awarded in the disciplines of men's singles, ladies' singles, pair skating, and ice dancing. Skaters earned points toward qualifying for the 1997–98 Champions Series Final.

Results

Men
Steven Cousins withdrew from the men's event.

Ladies

Pairs

Ice dancing

References

Trophée Lalique, 1997
Internationaux de France
Trophée Éric Bompard
Figure
International figure skating competitions hosted by France
November 1997 sports events in Europe